Bird Bones in the Bughouse is the second EP from The Dead Science, released in 2004 on Absolutely Kosher Records.  It includes a cover of Terence Trent D'Arby's "Sign Your Name" featuring Jamie Stewart on back-up vocals.

Track listing
 "Ossuary" – 4:47
 "Gamma Knife" – 4:51
 "Film Strip Collage" – 5:28
 "Cuz She's Me" – 5:23
 "Sign Your Name" – 6:04

External links
 MP3 of "Ossuary" (from official band site)
 MP3 of "Gamma Knife" (from record label)
 Absolutely Kosher (record label)

2004 EPs
The Dead Science albums